Electric Joy is the third studio album by guitarist Richie Kotzen, released in 1991 through Shrapnel Records.

Track listing

Personnel
Richie Kotzen – guitar, bass, tubular bell, arrangement, engineering, mixing, production
Atma Anur – drums, percussion
Mark Rennick – engineering, mixing
Shawn Morris – engineering
Tom Coyne – mastering

References

External links
In Review: Richie Kotzen "Electric Joy" at Guitar Nine Records

Richie Kotzen albums
1991 albums
Shrapnel Records albums